James Christopher Flowers is an American private equity investor and investment manager focused on the financial services industry. He is a Managing Director and CEO of J.C. Flowers & Co., and a member of the firm's Management Committee.

Early life and education
Flowers was born in California and grew up in Wayland, Massachusetts. He graduated magna cum laude from Harvard University with a degree in Applied Mathematics.

Professional career

Goldman Sachs 
Flowers worked at Goldman Sachs for 19 years starting in March 1979, and was a founder of Goldman's financial institutions merger practice in the 1980s. Flowers was named partner in 1988, the same year as former Goldman CEO Lloyd Blankfein and former Merrill Lynch CEO John Thain. At 31, he was one of the youngest Goldman Sachs partners in history. Flowers retired from Goldman in 1998, one of fifteen partners to leave the bank prior to its 1998 initial public offering.

J.C. Flowers & Co. 
In 1998, Flowers founded J.C. Flowers & Co., a private equity advisory and fund management firm which has acquired major equity stakes in Shinsei, NIBC Bank, HSH Nordbank and other financial institutions. As of 2017, the company manages assets of US $6.7 billion.

Flowers was the main partner of Ripplewood Holdings CEO Tim Collins in the 2000 acquisition of Long-Term Credit Bank of Japan to form Shinsei Bank. He became a director of Shinsei Bank in March 2000. Shinsei's initial public offering in 2004 netted a profit of approximately $1 billion for himself and $7 billion total for his investment group. However, the value of the investor group's stake decreased in the following years.

Involvement in the 2008 financial crisis 
After an unsuccessful attempt to arrange an acquisition of Sallie Mae in 2007, Flowers became deeply involved in the financial crisis of September 2008. He was approached by AIG to advise it on avoiding an imminent financial collapse. Flowers was well acquainted with Treasury Secretary Henry Paulson from their days together at Goldman Sachs, and was among the first to warn Paulson of the impending disaster at AIG. Flowers continued to advise Bank of America as it gave up on a Lehman acquisition and went on to acquire Merrill Lynch. Flowers's role in the crisis was portrayed by Michael O'Keefe in the 2011 HBO film Too Big to Fail.

In September 2008, Flowers also purchased the First National Bank of Cainesville, a regional bank in Missouri, renaming it Flowers National Bank. Flowers sold the bank to Farmers Bank of Northern Missouri in 2016.

In June 2014, Flowers completed the first public listing of a British bank on the London Stock Exchange's main market for more than a decade when he floated U.K. bank OneSavings Bank (OSB), a small business and mortgage lender he bought into in 2010. Later that year he argued that banking regulations in the wake of the 2008 financial crisis had depressed profitability so much that lenders would struggle to attract enough investors to survive the next financial crisis. In 2016, Fortune reported that he suffered heavy losses from the Brexit vote, largely as a result of private equity investments in OSB; however, by 2018, Flowers had completely exited OSB in one of the most profitable recent financial services deals.

Philanthropy
J. Christopher Flowers is the founder of the Anne and Chris Flowers Foundation and the J.C. Flowers Foundation. The J.C Flowers Foundation has local African teams in Angola, Namibia, Zambia, and Zimbabwe, as well as Harlem in the US.  In 2004, the Flowers Foundation launched NetsforLife, a partnership working with Episcopal Relief & Development to fight malaria in Africa. Flowers also co-founded the Isdell:Flowers Cross Border Malaria Initiative and supports the Harlem Parolee Initiative.

Flowers joined the Kasparov Chess Foundation Board in February 2015.

Flowers established the Woodford L. and Ann A. Flowers University Professorship at Harvard in honor of his parents in 2003. The current professor endowed by the fund is George Whitesides. Flowers also participated in the creation of the Harvard Professorship Challenge Fund in 2006, a $50 million fund to endow further professors.

References

Living people
Private equity and venture capital investors
Goldman Sachs people
Harvard University alumni
American billionaires
American chief executives of financial services companies
People from North Haven, Maine
Year of birth missing (living people)